Maybe I'll Come Home in the Spring is a 1971 American made-for-television drama film directed by Joseph Sargent and starring Sally Field, Eleanor Parker, Jackie Cooper, Lane Bradbury and David Carradine. The film originally premiered as the ABC Movie of the Week on February 16, 1971.

Plot
Sally Field stars as Denise "Dennie" Miller, a teenage girl who returns to her parents' suburban home after having run away previously, and returning a year later having lived with hippies. Lane Bradbury plays her younger sister Susie, who also is following in her footsteps, wanting the idealistic hippie life but making some rash decisions in the process. David Carradine plays Dennie's boyfriend, and he comes back to try to win her back. Linda Ronstadt is heard on several of the songs used in the film. The film is a period piece showcasing the family struggles often facing two generations in the late 1960s and early 1970s.  At the end of the film, Susie runs away from home as Dennie had earlier.

Cast
Sally Field as Denise "Dennie" Miller
Eleanor Parker as Claire Miller
Lane Bradbury as Susie Miller
David Carradine as Flack
Jackie Cooper as Ed Miller

References

External links 
 

1971 television films
1971 films
1971 drama films
1970s English-language films
ABC Movie of the Week
Films directed by Joseph Sargent
Films scored by Earl Robinson
Hippie films
American drama television films
1970s American films